Rosciano is a comune and town in the Province of Pescara in the Abruzzo region of Italy

References

See also
 Palazzo De Felice